Marilyn Livingstone (born 30 September 1952) is a Scottish Labour Co-operative politician, who served as the Member of the Scottish Parliament (MSP) for Kirkcaldy constituency from 1999 to 2011.

Before her election in 1999 she was the head of the Business School at Fife College. She was also a councillor on Kirkcaldy District Council and Fife Council. She won re-election from the Kirkcaldy constituency in the 2003 and 2007 elections,

In the 2011 election she was unsuccessful, losing to the Scottish National Party's David Torrance by 182 votes.

Electoral history

References

External links 
 

1952 births
Living people
Scottish Labour councillors
Councillors in Fife
Labour Co-operative MSPs
Members of the Scottish Parliament 1999–2003
Members of the Scottish Parliament 2003–2007
Members of the Scottish Parliament 2007–2011
Female members of the Scottish Parliament
20th-century Scottish women politicians
Women councillors in Scotland